Danish Government Scholarship is an award of financial aid for foreign applicants coming to Denmark.

Eligible countries
 Brazil
 China
 Japan
 Egypt
 South Korea
 Russia

References

Scholarships
Government scholarships
Education in Denmark